Jennifer Kay "Jenny" Ludlam  (born 23 July 1951 in Taumarunui, New Zealand) is a New Zealand-born actress, who remains best known for her roles in Australian television.

Acting roles
In Australia, she was a regular cast member in the short-lived soap opera Waterloo Station (1983) followed by guest stints on Prisoner (as Janice Grant in 1984), and Sons and Daughters. She was also a presenter on the long-running ABC children's TV series Play School. Returning to New Zealand, Ludlam has had roles in several television shows, movies and theatre productions.

Honours 
In the 2005 New Year Honours, Ludlam was made a Member of the New Zealand Order of Merit, for services to theatre.

Filmography

Film

Television

References

External links
 
Jennifer Ludlam: NZ On Screen

New Zealand television actresses
Australian television actresses
Living people
1951 births
Members of the New Zealand Order of Merit
New Zealand expatriates in Australia
Australian children's television presenters
New Zealand children's television presenters
People from Taumarunui